Woodstock Hall Tavern, also known as the Woods-Tavern, Woodstock Hall, and Hilandale, is a historic tavern located at Ivy, Albemarle County, Virginia. It was built in 1757, and enlarged by the addition of a front wing in 1808.  It consists of the original two-story, frame hall-parlor dwelling, with the addition of the temple-front, Federal-style wing.  It is one of Albemarle County's oldest extant structures.

It was added to the National Register of Historic Places in 1987.

References

Taverns in Virginia
Drinking establishments on the National Register of Historic Places in Virginia
Buildings and structures completed in 1757
Buildings and structures in Albemarle County, Virginia
National Register of Historic Places in Albemarle County, Virginia